Chanticleer Island is a nearly snow-free island,  long, lying off the north-west end of Hoseason Island in the Palmer Archipelago. The island was named by the UK Antarctic Place-Names Committee in 1960 after HMS Chanticleer (Captain Henry Foster), whose party made a landing in this vicinity on January 7, 1829.

See also 
 List of Antarctic and subantarctic islands

References 

Islands of the Palmer Archipelago